The Atlantic University Alliance is an association of three universities on the Atlantic coast of Ireland.  It presently comprises the University of Galway, the University of Limerick and University College, Cork (UCC).

External links
Atlantic University Alliance (AUA.ie) website (archived)

College and university associations and consortia in Europe
Universities and colleges in the Republic of Ireland